Mladen Hren (born 5 August 1998) is a Croatian film, television and theater actor.

Filmography

Film

Television

Stage

References 

1998 births
Croatian film actors
Croatian theatre people
Croatian television actors
Living people